Brian Nankervis (born 1956) is an Australian writer, actor, radio host, television producer and comedian.

Personal life
Nankervis was born in Melbourne. He lives in St Kilda with documentary film maker, Sue Thomson and their children, Claudia, Lola, Henry-Joe and Brian's favourite, Jerry. He is one of the co-creators of the music quiz show, RocKwiz and co-hosts The Friday Revue on ABC Radio.

Career
Prior to acting, Nankervis was a primary school teacher at Wesley College, Glen Waverley, and Kingswood College, Box Hill. After six years of teaching he decided to quit to pursue his passion for acting. He got a job as a waiter in 1985 at a famous Melbourne theatre restaurant, The Last Laugh. It is famous for discovering comedians and performers such as Lynda Gibson, Jane Turner, Peter Moon, Richard Stubbs and many more.

Nankervis was originally best known for his character of Raymond J. Bartholomeuz, an eccentric beat poet. The character was popular during the 1980s and 1990s in regular appearances on Hey Hey It's Saturday. As Bartholomeuz, Nankervis also appeared weekly on Paul Hester's ABCTV series Hessie's Shed (1998–99) and in Bob Franklin's sitcom Introducing Gary Petty (2000).

Nankervis played the role of Dr Ray Good in the stage and TV versions of Let The Blood Run Free (TV series: 1990–92) and appeared in the ensemble cast of the sketch comedy series Jimeoin (1994–95). In 1997 he appeared in an episode of Smallest Room in the House.

He frequently appeared as himself on television and stage and was the regular warmup man and audience wrangler for The Panel and Thank God You're Here (2006–2009).

In 2005, Nankervis co-created the SBS music trivia game show RocKwiz (2005–2016), which he also appears in as adjudicator and co-host alongside Julia Zemiro, as well as co-writing the scripts and co-producing the show. RocKwiz is filmed in front of a live audience in the Gershwin Room at St Kilda's Esplanade Hotel, however the show often tours around Australia and festivals. Nankervis is responsible for a thorough pre-show quiz which ends with him selecting the members who will appear on the team panels alongside the night's celebrity.

At the beginning of 2016, Nankervis became one of the hosts of The Friday Revue on ABC Radio with Richelle Hunt. The show runs for two hours and features "chat, guests, live music, some comedy and news snippets that will make it a ‘must listen to’ program either live or later on demand. Given Brian is known for being one of the country's preeminent musical "quizmeisters" there will of course be a quiz – but not just any quiz."

Nankervis continues to work with his partner Sue Thomson and has co-produced some of her documentaries, ABC's Boys and Balls starring Roy and HG, Ted Whitten and Ron Barassi (1994), Network Ten's Class Clowns for the Melbourne International Comedy Festival and Tempest at the Drop In (2015).

Nankervis outed himself as a "one time member" of TISM on RocKwiz in November 2011.

Nankervis was the first adult to initiate a prank on ABC's Prank Patrol (2010) where he pranked his own children. The episode "The Force" aired on TV station ABC3 on 5 September 2011.

References

1956 births
Living people
Australian male comedians
Australian television personalities
Comedians from Melbourne
Television personalities from Melbourne
Australian schoolteachers
People from St Kilda, Victoria